Pollanisus angustifrons is a moth of the family Zygaenidae. It is found in north-eastern Queensland, Australia.

The length of the forewings is 7–7.5 mm for males. Adults have only been collected in March and April, but there are probably two or more generations per year.

External links
Australian Faunal Directory
Zygaenid moths of Australia: a revision of the Australian Zygaenidae

Moths of Australia
angustifrons
Moths described in 2005